The Airspeed AS.39 Fleet Shadower was a British long-range patrol aircraft design that did not go beyond the prototype stage. A similar aircraft, the General Aircraft Fleet Shadower, was also built to the extent of prototypes. While the concept of a fleet shadower had some promise, the resulting designs were soon overtaken by wartime developments in airborne radar.

Design and development
The Royal Navy envisaged a need (Operational Requirement OR.52) for an aircraft that could shadow enemy fleets at night and the resulting Specification S.23/37 called for a slow-flying low-noise aircraft with a long range, capable of operating from an aircraft carrier's flight deck.

Five companies showed interest: Percival, Short Brothers, Fairey Aviation, General Aircraft Ltd and Airspeed.

General Aircraft submitted the G.A.L.38, of very similar general design to the AS.39. General Aircraft and Airspeed were selected to build two prototypes each and Airspeed received a contract on 10 August 1938.

The AS.39 was a high-wing, semi-cantilever, strut-braced (on the outer panels) monoplane with wooden wings and tail unit and an all-metal monocoque fuselage.  It had a fixed, divided type landing gear and tailwheel.  The observation aircraft had a crew of three: pilot, observer and radio operator. The AS.39 had a unique crew configuration with the observer accommodated in the nose with clear-vision windows on three sides and the pilot's compartment raised to allow passage to the radio operator's compartment.  Four small  Pobjoy Niagara V seven-cylinder air-cooled radial engines were mounted on the wings. This maximized propwash over the wing giving extra lift at low speed. The wings could be folded for storage when used on an aircraft carrier.

Operational history
Of two prototypes started, only one was completed, flying on 17 October 1940, the first flight was delayed due to problems with the Niagara V engines which had a vibration problem.  The prototype had stability problems and poor stall handling not helped by the under-powered engines.  Airspeed were asked to respond to a proposal to re-engine the aircraft with two Armstrong Whitworth Cheetah XI radial engines and add rear-facing machine guns. Only a preliminary proposal had been made and the second aircraft was not complete when on 17 February 1941 the Navy cancelled the fleet shadower program along with the AS.39, the company were requested to scrap both aircraft. The competing G.A.L.38 flew for a few months before it was cancelled and scrapped in March 1942.  The requirement for such aircraft had been made obsolete due to the introduction of radar on long-range patrol aircraft such as the Liberator I.

Specifications (AS.39)

See also

References
Notes

Bibliography

"Airspeed Types." Flight, 1951
 Bridgman, Leonard, ed. Jane’s All The World’s Aircraft 1945–1946. London: Samson Low, Marston & Company, Ltd, 1946.
 Butler, Phil. "The Night Shawdowers." Air-Britain Aeromilitaria Vol. 32, Issue 125, Spring 2006, pp. 19–22. ISSB 0262-8791.
"Fleet Shadower." Fleet Air Arm archive. Retrieved: 2 February 2007.
 Jarrett, Phil. "Nothing ventured...", Part 24. Aeroplane Monthly, April 1992, Vol 20 No 4. London: IPC. ISSN 0143-7240. pp. 16–19.
 Jarrett, Phil. "Nothing ventured... General Aircraft GAL 38 Night Shadower". Aeroplane Monthly, May 1992, Vol 20 No 5. London: IPC. ISSN 0143-7240. pp. 18–23.
 Jarrett, Phil. "Nothing ventured... Airspeed AS.39 Night Shadower". Aeroplane Monthly, June 1992, Vol 20 No 6. London: IPC. ISSN 0143-7240. pp. 52–57.
 Winchester, Jim, ed. "General Aircraft Fleet Shadower (1940)". The World's Worst Aircraft: From Pioneering Failures to Multimillion Dollar Disasters. London: Amber Books Ltd., 2005. .

External links

Profile – Flying Slow – Fleet Shadower concept

Fleet Shadower
1940s British patrol aircraft
Cancelled military aircraft projects of the United Kingdom
Carrier-based aircraft
Four-engined tractor aircraft
High-wing aircraft
Aircraft first flown in 1940
Four-engined piston aircraft